Pottsgrove is a census-designated place (CDP) in Montgomery County, Pennsylvania, United States. The population was 3,469 at the 2010 census.

Geography
Pottsgrove is located at  (40.261983, -75.612585).

Demographics

As of the 2010 census, the CDP was 93.2% Non-Hispanic White, 3.1% Black or African American, 0.9% Asian, and 1.4% were two or more races. 1.8% of the population were of Hispanic or Latino ancestry.

At the 2000 census there were 3,266 people, 1,203 households, and 973 families living in the CDP. The population density was 1,191.7 people per square mile (460.2/km2). There were 1,237 housing units at an average density of 451.4/sq mi (174.3/km2).  The racial makeup of the CDP was 97.52% White, 0.89% African American, 0.03% Native American, 0.83% Asian, 0.03% Pacific Islander, 0.12% from other races, and 0.58% from two or more races. Hispanic or Latino people of any race were 0.61%.

There were 1,203 households, 33.5% had children under the age of 18 living with them, 72.3% were married couples living together, 6.0% had a female householder with no husband present, and 19.1% were non-families. 15.5% of households were made up of individuals, and 8.0% were one person aged 65 or older. The average household size was 2.71 and the average family size was 3.02.

The age distribution was 24.7% under the age of 18, 5.0% from 18 to 24, 28.0% from 25 to 44, 28.3% from 45 to 64, and 14.0% 65 or older. The median age was 41 years. For every 100 females, there were 101.6 males. For every 100 females age 18 and over, there were 95.7 males.

The median household income was $63,750 and the median family income  was $68,578. Males had a median income of $45,920 versus $37,644 for females. The per capita income for the CDP was $30,649. About 1.0% of families and 2.0% of the population were below the poverty line, including 1.3% of those under age 18 and none of those age 65 or over.

Education
Pottsgrove is served by the Pottsgrove School District. Its high school is Pottsgrove High School.

Notable people
 Kendal Conrad - country singer and actress
 Washington Gladden - congregational pastor and leader of Social Gospel movement

References

Census-designated places in Montgomery County, Pennsylvania
Populated places on the Schuylkill River
Census-designated places in Pennsylvania